William H. "Dick" Hurley (1847–Aft. 1916) was an American baseball player who is notable for being the substitute player for the first paid professional club, the Cincinnati Red Stockings.

Hurley was born in Honesdale, Pennsylvania. After attending Columbia University and playing on its baseball team, he played for the Buckeyes of Cincinnati, one of the leading amateur teams in the Midwest. Along with two of his teammates, Andy Leonard and Charlie Sweasy, he was recruited by Harry Wright as the utility man for the rival Cincinnati Red Stockings in 1869–70, being paid $600 per season for his efforts.

In 1916, Hurley managed the Great Falls Electrics in the Northwestern League.

References
The Baseball Page

External links

Harper's Weekly
Buckeyes of Cincinnati

Cincinnati Buckeyes players
Cincinnati Red Stockings players
Washington Olympics (NABBP) players
Washington Olympics players
Baseball players from Pennsylvania
19th-century baseball players
1847 births
Year of death missing